This list of U.S. states by Alford plea usage documents usage of the form of guilty plea known as the Alford plea in each of the U.S. states in the United States. An Alford plea (also referred to as Alford guilty plea and Alford doctrine) in the law of the United States is a guilty plea in criminal court, where the defendant does not admit the act and asserts innocence. Under the Alford plea, the defendant admits that sufficient evidence exists with which the prosecution could likely convince a judge or jury to find the defendant guilty beyond a reasonable doubt.

The Alford plea arose out of the 1970 case before the Supreme Court of the United States, North Carolina v. Alford, where the Court ruled that the defendant could be allowed to enter a guilty plea while still maintaining innocence. According to the United States Department of Justice, in 2000 a greater percentage of State inmates made use of the plea than Federal inmates. The state courts of Indiana, Michigan, and New Jersey do not allow usage of the plea. It has been used in other states, and in application of the plea process the courts require the plea to be of a voluntary nature and based on factual evidence. The courts make an effort to determine defendants are entering the plea by their own choice, and that there is a factual basis for the plea; they accomplish this by questioning the defendant about their choice and the prosecution about the potential case against the defendant. Once entered, the plea is treated as a standard guilty plea.


Background

State usage
The Alford plea arose out of the 1970 case before the Supreme Court of the United States, North Carolina v. Alford. In that case, the Supreme Court ruled that the defendant could enter a plea of guilty while still asserting his innocence. The ruling of the Court stated that the defendant, "may voluntarily, knowingly, and understandingly consent to the imposition of a prison sentence even if he is unwilling or unable to admit his participation in the acts constituting the crime." This form of guilty plea has been frequently used in local and state courts in the United States; though it consists of a small percentage of all plea bargains in the U.S. In 2000 the United States Department of Justice noted, "About 17% of State inmates and 5% of Federal inmates submitted either an Alford plea or a no contest plea, regardless of the type of attorney. This difference reflects the relative readiness of State courts, compared to Federal courts, to accept an alternative plea."

Indiana, Michigan, and New Jersey forbid the usage of Alford pleas within their state court systems. Writing in Cornell Law Review, Stephanos Bibas described the position of the Indiana Supreme Court, "The Supreme Court of Indiana has held that judges may not accept guilty pleas accompanied by protestations of innocence. The court suggested that Alford pleas risk being unintelligent, involuntary, and inaccurate. Another reason for the Indiana rule is that Alford pleas undercut public respect for the justice system."

Functional application

According to the 2009 book Criminal Evidence: Principles and Cases by Thomas J. Gardner and Terry M. Anderson, "The Alford plea is not mandatory for states, but most states have adopted it. State judges, however, are generally not obligated to accept an Alford plea. Most judges do accept it because the sentence given is the same as the sentence for a regular guilty plea under the state sentencing guidelines." Criminal Evidence explained the application of the Alford plea in U.S. states, "Most state courts hold that an Alford plea is the 'functional equivalent' of a regular plea of guilty. Therefore, a defendant who enters a guilty plea, whether an Alford plea or a regular guilty plea, has lost almost all rights to appeal. Most courts hold that the only issues applicable are the voluntary and intelligent nature of the plea and the jurisdiction of the court."

In the 2008 book Criminal Procedure, author John M. Scheb pointed out that a majority of the states have initiated measures to make sure that the plea is entered into of the defendant's own accord, and that it is grounded in a factual basis. Scheb wrote, "Most states have adopted similar rules of procedure to ensure that pleas are voluntary and comply with constitutional requirements." He explained that judges have some discretion in determining the voluntary nature of the plea given by the defendant, "Rules concerning voluntariness and factual basis generally do not specify any precise method to be followed by the court. Judges employ various methods to determine voluntariness. Often these methods include interrogation of the defendant by the judge and sometimes by the prosecutor and defense counsel." Scheb noted that, "The objective is to establish that no improper inducements have been made to secure a plea, that the defendant understands the basic constitutional rights incident to a trial, that these rights are being waived, and that he or she comprehends the consequences of the plea." Scheb discussed the manner in which the court determines the factual basis for the plea, "In determining that a factual basis exists for the defendant's plea, judges often have the prosecutor briefly outline available proof to establish a prima facie case of the defendant's guilt. A more extensive inquiry is usually necessary for specific-intent crimes." Scheb emphasized the importance why it is necessary to establish a factual basis for the plea, before it is entered by the defendant: "The thoroughness of the court's determination of voluntariness and factual basis becomes important if a defendant later moves to withdraw a plea and enter a plea of not guilty."

Table

U.S. states

Federal

United States courts of appeals
United States courts of appeals

See also

Alternative pleading
Deferred Adjudication
Insanity defense
Malum in se
Malum prohibitum
Peremptory plea

References

Further reading

External links

Alford Doctrine - State of Connecticut, Judicial Branch
USAM 9-16.000 Pleas—Federal Rule of Criminal Procedure 11, United States Department of Justice
Issue: Effect of Alford Plea of Guilty, Issues In NY Criminal Law, Volume 4, Issue 11.
Transcript Of Plea Form, North Carolina, with question about term
Court cases
North Carolina v. Alford, Supreme Court of the United States
US v. Szucko, Definition of term by United States Court of Appeals for the Fifth Circuit
US v. Bierd, Definition of term by United States Court of Appeals for the First Circuit

Alford plea
Alford Plea
Alford Plea